Mount Kigali or Mont Kigali in French, is a hill in Kigali City, Rwanda, after which the city was named. Mount Kigali is located directly West of the city center in Nyarugenge District. The majority of Nyarugenge District is located on the slopes of Mont Kigali. The western slopes of Mount Kigali end in the valley of the river Nyabarongo. As a result, Mount Kigali offers expansive views of the entire city of Kigali to the east and north, the Southern Province to the west and south, and the Eastern Province to the east and south.

References

Kigali
Mountains of Rwanda